Grand Park Sports Campus is a sports complex located in Westfield, Indiana. The  park features 26 baseball and softball diamonds, 31 multipurpose fields for soccer, football, and lacrosse. The Grand Park Events Center is now open, featuring three full-sized indoor soccer fields, a restaurant and administrative offices. The Pacers Athletic Center indoor basketball/volleyball facility opened in January 2016. The site hosted the 2016 Big Ten Conference Men's Soccer Tournament and the 2017 Big Ten Conference Women's Soccer Tournament. Grand Park  has also hosted notable appearances such as Machine Gun Kelly in the main Grand Park events center. The Indianapolis Colts also uses this site for training camp and the Georgia Bulldogs also used Grand Park for training during the 2022 College football playoffs.

The sports complex was conceived by mayor Andy Cook, who campaigned on the issue and won over critics of the plan.

Facilities

Pacers Athletic Center 
The Pacers Athletic Center is an indoor sporting facility on the complex. It hosts five basketball courts, and two multipurpose indoor courts for various sports. The Center is privately owned by the Indiana Pacers NBA team. It was purchased from Johnathan Byrd in 2017.

Grand Park Events Center 
The Grand Park Events Center, which opened in the summer of 2016, is a centerpiece of the  Grand Park Sports Campus, one of the largest sporting complexes in the world. The facility features three full-sized professional turf fields, a spectator lounge, retail space, locker facilities, office and meeting space, and administrative offices. It also includes multi-use space for trade shows, live entertainment, conventions and special event programming, including large indoor field sports events in the massive  facility. The architect of record is Eric Weflen, AIA; RQAW Corporation

Grand Park Baseball Complex 
The baseball complex features 26 baseball diamonds (8 synthetic, all lighted)

Grand Park Soccer Complex 
The soccer complex features 31 soccer fields (7 synthetic turf, 8 lighted). It is the training ground of Indy Eleven. Starting in 2022, it is the home field of the Indy Eleven USL W League team.

References

External links
Official site

College soccer venues in the United States
Soccer venues in Indiana
American football venues in Indiana
Basketball venues in Indiana
Baseball venues in Indiana
Indoor arenas in Indiana
Softball venues in Indiana
Volleyball venues in Indiana
Sports venues completed in 2016
2016 establishments in Indiana
Sports complexes in the United States